Sarkar Colony is a 2011 Indian Malayalam-language film directed by V. S. Jayakrishna, starring Mukesh and Devayani as the lead pair.

Plot
Sarkar Colony portrays the lives of  ordinary government servants who with their meagre wages, struggle to make both ends meet. Some of them turn to some extra business ventures to earn some quick money.

Cast

Soundtrack

The music of Sarkar Colony was composed by M. G. Sreekumar. The lyrics are written by Bichu Thirumala and Rajeev Alumkal.
The film has three songs. The singers in the film are M. G. Sreekumar, Nayana, Afsal and Madhu Balakrishnan.

Production
The film has been completed in a single schedule and in a record time of twenty three days. It was shot on locations in Thiruvananthapuram.

References

 Nowrunning article
 Indiaglitz review
 Sarkar Colony movie in Malayalam Movies

2011 comedy films
2011 films
2010s Malayalam-language films
Films shot in Thiruvananthapuram